Lilija Dinere (1955, Riga)  is a Latvian painter and book illustrator.

Biography
Born in Riga, Dinere graduated from the painting – stage design department of the Latvian Academy of Art in 1980. She has illustrated more than 50 books, and has participated in exhibitions in Latvia and abroad, especially Germany.  Dinere's works are held in the Latvian National Museum of Art, Artists Union collection, the A. Pushkin State Museum of Visual Art, the State Tretyakov Gallery in Moscow, the Frauen Museum in Bonn, the Gottland Museum of Art in Visby (Sweden) as well as in private collections worldwide.

Selected illustrated books 
 1980 - P.J. Beranger „Chansons”
 1984 - Maurice Carême „L'Arlequin de la Lune”
 1987 – François Villon „Poesies Completes”
 1990 - Lars Gyllensten „Three Novels”
 1990 - Cecilija Dinere „Poetry”
 1993, 1994, 1995 - „Dede Korkud” (ancient Turkish Epos)
 1993 - Lord Byron „Hebrew Melodies”
 1995 - „Celtic Myths”
 1997 - „Book of Job” (Old Testament)
 1999, 2000 - „Latvian Anthology of Love Poems” I, II volumes
 2005. – “Psalms”, (Old Testament)
 2010 – "Song of Roland", (French: La Chanson de Roland, Old French Epos), illustrated together with Roberts Diners

References

External links 
 Lilija Dinere
 В Национальном художественном музее открылась юбилейная выставка известной латвийской художницы gorod.lv, 19 мая 2006 года
 T. Šaitere Mākslinieces Lilijas Dineres mājoklī beidzies remonts, Diena
 Interview with Liliju Dineri laikrakstā «NRA» 2011.07.13.
 Interview with Liliju Dineri žurnālā «L’Officiel.Latvija» 2011.g. marta numurā (Nr.26) (Е. Певнева, «Палитра гармонии», «L’Officiel.Latvija»)
 Mākslinieki Lilija Dinere un Roberts Diners piedalās izstādē «Hibrīdu pārlidojumi»

Soviet painters
Artists from Riga
1955 births
Living people
Latvian women painters
20th-century Latvian painters
21st-century Latvian painters
20th-century Latvian women artists
21st-century Latvian women artists